Count Edward Bernard Raczyński (December 19, 1891 – July 30, 1993) was a Polish diplomat, writer, politician, President of Poland-in-exile (between 1979 and 1986).

He was the longest living (101), and oldest serving Polish President (from the age of 88 to 95).

Biography 

Count Edward Bernard Maria Raczyński was born December 19, 1891, in Zakopane, to a Polish aristocratic family. His father was Count Edward Aleksander Raczyński of Nałęcz coat of arms, and his mother Róża née Countess Potocka. The Raczyńskis were related to the Austro-Hungarian house of Habsburgs. The full name was "Raczyński z Małyszyna", as they were a branch of the noble family Nałęcz-Małyski from Greater Poland (the area of the town of Wieluń) and about 1540 took their name from the estate of Raczyn near Wieluń. However, the Raczyńskis remained relatively unknown until the 18th century, when four of them became Senators of Poland under different reigns. One of the Raczyńskis became a Knight of the Order of the White Eagle during the reign of King August the Strong, six of them were awarded the Virtuti Militari order during the time of Duchy of Warsaw and three received the same distinction during the November Uprising of 1831. The title of Count was awarded to different branches of the family by Prussian Kings Friedrich Wilhelm III (in 1824) and Wilhelm II (in 1905). One of their kin was a Knight of the highest Prussian Order of the Black Eagle.

Raczyński spent most of his childhood in Kraków, in the family palace Pod Baranami and in the family palace in Rogalin in Greater Poland. He studied law in Leipzig, Kraków, and London (the London School of Economics) and was awarded with a doctorate of the Jagiellonian University in Kraków in 1915. In November 1918, Raczynski joined the army of the resuscitated Poland, from which he was called to the diplomatic service in May 1919. Until 1925, he worked in Polish embassies and missions in Bern, Copenhagen and London. Back in Warsaw, he became the head of the department of international agreements. In 1932, Raczyński was appointed Polish ambassador to the League of Nations and in 1934 he became the ambassador of the Republic of Poland in the United Kingdom. On behalf of Poland, he signed the Polish-British alliance (August 25, 1939) which ultimately led the United Kingdom to declare war on Nazi Germany after the country's invasion.

World War II

Following the September 1, 1939 German Invasion of Poland Raczyński remained in London where he continued to serve as the ambassador of the Polish Government in Exile and one of its prominent members. Between July 22, 1941, and July 14, 1943, he was also the Polish Minister of Foreign Affairs in the cabinet of Władysław Sikorski. In this capacity, he provided the Allies with one of the earliest and most accurate accounts of the ongoing Holocaust ("The Mass Extermination of Jews in German Occupied Poland", Raczyński's Note addressed to the Governments of the United Nations on December 10, 1942") and pleaded for action.

Later life
After 1945, when the government of the United Kingdom broke the pacts with Poland and withdrew support for the Polish government, Raczyński remained in London, where he acted as one of the most notable members of Polish diaspora there. He was active in various political and social organisations in exile, including the Fundusz Pomocy Krajowi (Help for the Country Fund) which actively supported the democratic opposition in communist-controlled Poland. Between 1954 and 1972 he was one of the members of the Council of the Three, the collective presidential body of the Polish government in exile. He was also a member of the Committee for Polish Affairs and an advisor of various British governmental agencies and ministries.

In March 1979, Raczyński became president in exile, after being previously chosen by the outgoing President Stanisław Ostrowski. In turn, he chose as his successor Prime Minister Kazimierz Sabbat.

During the Raczyński presidency (1979–1986) the Solidarity movement was established in Poland. Raczyński played an important role in raising awareness about the events in Poland in Western countries and in establishing closer ties with the opposition movement in Poland.

President Raczyński at some point considered naming Władysław Bartoszewski as his successor, as he wanted to choose someone "from the country" and with strong ties to the Polish opposition movement. Bartoszewski, however, declined the offer.

After serving a 7-year term he resigned from his post on April 8, 1986. He was the last Polish President-in-Exile who had held an important office during the era of the 2nd Republic: his successors, Kazimierz Sabbat and Ryszard Kaczorowski were in their twenties at the outset of the Second World War. As he left office he received a praise for reuniting the Polish political emigration and reshaping the Government in exile.

Death and legacy
Raczyński died on July 30, 1993, at his home in London as the last male descendant of his line. His coffin was placed in the mausoleum of his family located at the chapel in Rogalin. In his last will and testament, Count Raczyński bequeathed his family's palace in Rogalin, and his library to the Polish nation. He was the longest living head of state in Poland's history and one of the very few centenarians among European politicians of the 20th century.

In 2004, a blue plaque was installed on the house where he lived and died, No. 8 Lennox Gardens in Brompton.

Honours 
 Order of the White Eagle (Poland)
 Grand Cross of the Order of Polonia Restituta (Poland)
 Honorary Knight Grand Cross of the Order of the British Empire (GBE)
 Grand Cross of the Order of Pius IX from the Pope
 Doctor Honoris Causa of the Polish University Abroad, London, in 1982; Jagellonian University in 1992
 Honorary citizen of the cities of Kraków and Poznań

Family 

In 1925, Edward Raczyński married Joyous Markham, daughter of a British coal mining mogul, Sir Arthur Markham, 1st Baronet, but she died in 1931.

On August 25, 1932, he married his second wife, Cecylia Maria Jaroszyńska, by whom he had three daughters:
 Wanda Dembińska née Raczyńska (1933-2016), wife of Capt. Ryszard Dembiński (1924-2008), who was chairman of the Polish Institute and Sikorski Museum in 1979-2003
 Viridianna Rey, née Raczyńska (b. 1935), wife of Count Xawery Rey (1934–1987)
 Katarzyna Raczyńska (b. 1939)
In 1962, his second wife Cecylia died.

In 1991, at the age of 99, Edward Raczyński married his third wife, Aniela Lilpop (daughter of architect, Franciszek Lilpop), thus legalizing a union of many years.

Bibliography 
Raczyński's Works
 Edward Raczyński, The British-Polish Alliance, Its Origin and Meaning; London 1948
 Edward Raczyński, W sojuszniczym Londynie. Dziennik ambasadora Edwarda Raczyńskiego 1939–1945; London 1960. 
 Edward Raczynski, "In Allied London. The Wartime diaries of the Polish Ambassador", London, Weidenfeld and Nicolson, 1962.
 Omar Khayyám, Rubayat. Polish translation by Edward Raczyński, London, 1960.
 Edward Raczyński, Rogalin i jego mieszkańcy. London, 1969. 
 Edward Raczyński, Pani Róża (a Biography of his mother), London 1969. 
 Edward Raczyński, Od Narcyza Kulikowskiego do Winstona Churchilla. London 1976
 Edward Raczynski (with Tadeusz Zenczykowski), "Od Genewy do Jalty. Rozmowy radiowe", London, Puls, 1988.
 Edward Raczyński, Czas wielkich zmian. Paris 1990. 
Family History
Simon Konarski, Armorial de la Noblesse Polonaise titrée, Paris 1958

Raczyński's Biography

 Krzysztof Kania, Edward Bernard Raczynski, 1891–1993, Dyplomata i Polityk, Wydawnictwo Neriton, Warszawa, 2014

See also 
 History of Poland
 Polish Government in Exile
 Edward Raczyński
 Edward Raczyński (1786–1845), Polish conservative politician, protector of arts, founder of the Raczynski Library in Poznań

References

External links 
 Ex Libris of Edward Raczyński
 Rogalin palace
 rogalin.org – Informations for tourists and citizens.

1891 births
1993 deaths
People from Zakopane
People from the Kingdom of Galicia and Lodomeria
Edward
Counts of Poland
Presidents of Poland
Ambassadors of Poland to the United Kingdom
Honorary Knights Grand Cross of the Order of the British Empire
Men centenarians
Polish centenarians
Polish emigrants to the United Kingdom
Rada Trzech
World War II political leaders
Diplomats of the Second Polish Republic
Permanent Representatives of Poland to the League of Nations
Polish anti-communists
Recipients of the Order of the White Eagle (Poland)